In the United States, redlining is a discriminatory practice in which services (financial and otherwise) are withheld from potential customers who reside in neighborhoods classified as "hazardous" to investment; these neighborhoods have significant numbers of racial and ethnic minorities, and low-income residents. While the most well-known examples involve denial of credit and insurance, also sometimes attributed to redlining in many instances are: denial of healthcare and the development of food deserts in minority neighborhoods. In the case of retail businesses like supermarkets, the purposeful construction of stores impractically far away from targeted residents results in a redlining effect.

Reverse redlining occurs when a lender or insurer targets majority-minority neighborhood residents with inflated interest rates by taking advantage of the lack of lending competition relative to non-redlined neighborhoods. The effect also emerges when service providers artificially restrict the supply of real estate available for loanable funds to nonwhites, thus providing alternative pretext for higher rates. Neighborhoods which were targeted for blockbusting were also subject to reverse redlining.

In the 1960s, sociologist John McKnight originally coined the term to describe the discriminatory banking practice of classifying certain neighborhoods as "hazardous," or not worthy of investment due to the racial makeup of their residents. During the heyday of redlining, the areas most frequently discriminated against were Black inner city neighborhoods. For example, in the 1980s a Pulitzer Prize-winning series of articles by investigative reporter Bill Dedman demonstrated how Atlanta banks would often lend in lower-income white neighborhoods but not in middle-income or even upper-income Black neighborhoods. Blacklisting was a related mechanism employed by redlining institutions to keep track of areas, groups, and people that the discriminating party intended to exclude. In academic literature, redlining falls under the broader category of credit rationing. The documented history of redlining in the United States is a manifestation of the historical systemic racism that has had wide-ranging impacts on American society, two examples being educational and housing inequality across racial groups. Redlining is also an example of spatial inequality and economic inequality.

History 

The specific process termed "redlining" in the United States occurred on the background of racial segregation and discrimination against minority populations. It had its origins in sales practices of the National Association of Real Estate Boards and theories about race and property values codified by economists surrounding Richard T. Ely and his Institute for Research in Land Economics and Public Utilities, founded at the University of Wisconsin in 1920. With the National Housing Act of 1934 the federal government began to be involved in the practice and the concurrent establishment of the Federal Housing Administration (FHA). The FHA's formalized redlining process was developed by their Chief Land Economist, Homer Hoyt, as part of an initiative to develop the first underwriting criteria for mortgages. The implementation of this federal policy accelerated the decay and isolation of minority inner-city neighborhoods through withholding of mortgage capital, making it even more difficult for neighborhoods to attract and retain families able to purchase homes. The discriminatory assumptions in redlining exacerbated residential racial segregation and urban decay in the United States.

In 1935, the Federal Home Loan Bank Board (FHLBB) asked the Home Owners' Loan Corporation (HOLC) to look at 239 cities and create "residential security maps" to indicate the level of security for real-estate investments in each surveyed city.  On the maps, the newest areas—those considered desirable for lending purposes—were outlined in green and known as "Type A". These were typically affluent suburbs on the outskirts of cities. "Type B" neighborhoods, outlined in blue, were considered "Still Desirable", whereas older "Type C" were labeled "Declining" and outlined in yellow. "Type D" neighborhoods were outlined in red and were considered the most risky for mortgage support. While about 85% of the residents of such neighborhoods were white, they included most of the African-American urban households. These neighborhoods tended to be the older districts in the center of cities; often they were also African-American neighborhoods. Urban planning historians theorize that the maps were used by private and public entities for years afterward to deny loans to people in black communities. But, recent research has indicated that the HOLC did not redline in its own lending activities and that the racist language reflected the bias of the private sector and experts hired to conduct the appraisals.

Redlining maps even became prominent under private organizations, such as appraiser J. M. Brewer's 1934 map of Philadelphia.  Private organizations created maps designed to meet the requirements of the Federal Housing Administration's underwriting manual. The lenders had to consider FHA standards if they wanted to receive FHA insurance for their loans. FHA appraisal manuals instructed banks to steer clear of areas with "inharmonious racial groups", and recommended that municipalities enact racially restrictive zoning ordinances. Between 1945 and 1959, African Americans received less than 2 percent of all federally insured home loans.

Banks and mortgage lenders were not the only private entities to develop redlining practices. Property insurance companies also  instituted rigid redlining policies in the post-World War II period. According to urban historian Bench Ansfield, the postwar advent of comprehensive homeowners' insurance was limited to the suburbs and withheld from neighborhoods of color in U.S. cities. One Aetna bulletin from 1964 advised underwriters to "use a red line around questionable areas on territorial maps." The New York Urban Coalition warned in 1978, “A neighborhood without insurance is a neighborhood doomed to death.”

Following a National Housing Conference in 1973, a group of Chicago community organizations led by The Northwest Community Organization (NCO) formed National People's Action (NPA), to broaden the fight against disinvestment and mortgage redlining in neighborhoods all over the country. This organization, led by Chicago housewife Gale Cincotta and Shel Trapp, a professional community organizer, targeted The Federal Home Loan Bank Board, the governing authority over federally chartered Savings and loan associations (S&L) that held at that time the bulk of the country's home mortgages. NPA embarked on an effort to build a national coalition of urban community organizations to pass a national disclosure regulation or law to require banks to reveal their lending patterns.

For many years, urban community organizations had battled neighborhood decay by attacking blockbusting (deceptive encouragement of white flight from neighborhoods in order to buy up real estate at a huge discount and then rent to low-income, usually black tenants), forcing landlords to maintain properties, and requiring cities to board up and tear down abandoned properties. These actions addressed the short-term issues of neighborhood decline. Neighborhood leaders began to learn that these issues and conditions were symptoms of disinvestment that was the true, though hidden, underlying cause of these problems. They changed their strategy as more data was gathered.

With the help of NPA, a coalition of loosely affiliated community organizations began to form. At the Third Annual Housing Conference held in Chicago in 1974, eight hundred delegates representing 25 states and 35 cities attended. The strategy focused on the Federal Home Loan Bank Board (FHLBB), which oversaw S&Ls in cities all over the country.

In 1974, Chicago's Metropolitan Area Housing Association (MAHA), made up of representatives of local organizations, succeeded in having the Illinois State Legislature pass laws mandating disclosure and outlawing redlining. In Massachusetts, organizers allied with NPA confronted a unique situation. Over 90% of home mortgages were held by state-chartered savings banks. A Jamaica Plain neighborhood organization pushed the disinvestment issue into the statewide gubernatorial race. The Jamaica Plain Banking & Mortgage Committee and its citywide affiliate, The Boston Anti-redlining Coalition (BARC), won a commitment from Democratic candidate Michael S. Dukakis to order statewide disclosure through the Massachusetts State Banking Commission. After Dukakis was elected, his new Banking Commissioner ordered banks to disclose mortgage-lending patterns by ZIP code. The suspected redlining was revealed. Richard W. "Rick" Wise, a former community organizer who led the Boston organizing, has published a novel, Redlined, which gives a somewhat fictionalized account of the anti-redlining campaign.

NPA and its affiliates achieved disclosure of lending practices with the passage of The Home Mortgage Disclosure Act of 1975. The required transparency and review of loan practices began to change lending practices. NPA began to work on reinvestment in areas that had been neglected. Their support helped gain passage in 1977 of the Community Reinvestment Act.

Efforts to end

Legislation 

In the United States, the Fair Housing Act of 1968 was passed to fight the practice of redlining. According to the Department of Housing and Urban Development, "The Fair Housing Act makes it unlawful to discriminate in the terms, conditions, or privileges of sale of a dwelling because of race or national origin. The Act also makes it unlawful for any person or other entity whose business includes residential real estate-related transactions to discriminate against any person in making available such a transaction, or in the terms or conditions of such a transaction, because of race or national origin."  The Office of Fair Housing and Equal Opportunity was tasked with administering and enforcing this law.

The Equal Credit Opportunity Act (ECOA) is a United States law (codified at 15 U.S.C. § 1691 et seq.), enacted 28 October 1974,[1] that makes it unlawful for any creditor to discriminate against any applicant, with respect to any aspect of a credit transaction, on the basis of race, color, religion, national origin, sex, marital status, or age (provided the applicant has the capacity to contract);[2] to the fact that all or part of the applicant's income derives from a public assistance program; or to the fact that the applicant has in good faith exercised any right under the Consumer Credit Protection Act. The law applies to any person who, in the ordinary course of business, regularly participates in a credit decision,[3] including banks, retailers, bankcard companies, finance companies, and credit unions.

The part of the law that defines its authority and scope is known as Regulation B,[4] from the (b) that appears in Title 12 part 1002's official identifier: 12 C.F.R. § 1002.1(b) (2017).[5] Failure to comply with Regulation B can subject a financial institution to civil liability for actual and punitive damages in individual or class actions. Liability for punitive damages can be as much as $10,000 in individual actions and the lesser of $500,000 or 1% of the creditor's net worth in class actions.[6]

The Community Reinvestment Act, passed by Congress in 1977 required banks to apply the same lending criteria in all communities.

Regulatory lawsuits 
In May 2015, the U.S. Department of Housing and Urban Development announced that Associated Bank had agreed to a $200 million settlement over redlining in Chicago and Milwaukee. The three-year HUD observation led to the complaint that the bank purposely rejected mortgage applications from black and Latino applicants. The final settlement required AB to open branches in non-white neighborhoods.

New York Attorney General Eric Schneiderman announced a settlement with Evans Bank for $825,000 on September 10, 2015. An investigation had uncovered the erasure of black neighborhoods from mortgage lending maps. According to Schneiderman, of the over 1,100 mortgage applications the bank received between 2009 and 2012, only four were from African Americans. Following this investigation, The Buffalo News reported that more banks could be investigated for the same reasons in the near future. The most notable examples of such DOJ and HUD settlements have focused heavily on community banks in large metropolitan areas, but banks in other regions have been the subject of such orders as well, including First United Security Bank in Thomasville, Alabama, and Community State Bank in Saginaw, Michigan.

The United States Department of Justice announced a $33 million settlement with Hudson City Savings Bank, which services New Jersey, New York, and Pennsylvania, on September 24, 2015. The six-year DOJ investigation had proven that the company was intentionally avoiding granting mortgages to Latinos and African Americans and purposely avoided expanding into minority-majority communities. The Justice Department called it the "largest residential mortgage redlining settlement in its history." As a part of the settlement agreement, HCSB was forced to open branches in non-white communities. As U.S. Attorney Paul Fishman explained to Emily Badger for The Washington Post, "[i]f you lived in a majority-black or Hispanic neighborhood and you wanted to apply for a mortgage, Hudson City Savings Bank was not the place to go." The enforcement agencies cited additional evidence of discrimination in Hudson City's broker selection practices, noting that the bank received 80 percent of its mortgage applications from mortgage brokers but that the brokers with whom the bank worked were not located in majority African-American and Hispanic areas.

On January 12, 2023, City National Bank of California agreed to pay $31,000,000 to resolve allegations of redlining from 2017 to at least 2020, brought by the United States Department of Justice.

Community organizations 
ShoreBank, a community-development bank in Chicago's South Shore neighborhood, was a part of the private sector fight against redlining.  Founded in 1973, ShoreBank sought to combat racist lending practices in Chicago's African-American communities by providing financial services, especially mortgage loans, to local residents. In a 1992 speech, then-Presidential candidate Bill Clinton called ShoreBank "the most important bank in America". On August 20, 2010, the bank was declared insolvent, closed by regulators and most of its assets were acquired by Urban Partnership Bank.

In the mid-1970s, community organizations, under the banner of the NPA, worked to fight against redlining in South Austin, Illinois. One of these organizations was SACCC (South Austin Coalition Community Council), formed to restore South Austin's neighborhood and to fight against financial institutions accused of propagating redlining. This got the attention of insurance regulators in the Illinois Department of Insurance, as well as federal officers enforcing anti-racial discrimination laws.

Current issues

Racial segregation in American cities 

The United States Federal Government has enacted legislation since the 1970s to reduce the segregation of American cities. While many cities have reduced the amount of segregated neighborhoods, some still have clearly defined racial boundaries. Since 1990, the City of Chicago has been one of the most persistently racially segregated cities, despite efforts to improve mobility and reduce barriers. Other cities like Detroit, Houston, and Atlanta likewise have very pronounced black and white neighborhoods, the same neighborhoods that were originally redlined by financial institutions decades ago. While other cities have made progress, this continued racial segregation has contributed to reduced economic mobility for millions of people.

Formerly redlined neighborhoods in places like Los Angeles have been shown to be more likely to have a gang injunction issued against them, as the work of geographer Stefano Bloch and anthropologist Susan A. Phillips shows.

Race wealth gap 

The practice of redlining actively helped to create what is now known as the Racial Wealth Gap seen in the United States.

Black families in America earned just $57.30 for every $100 in income earned by white families, according to the Census Bureau's Current Population Survey. For every $100 in white family wealth, black families hold just $5.04. In 2016, the median wealth for black and Hispanic families was $17,600 and $20,700, respectively, compared with white families' median wealth of $171,000. The black-white wealth gap has not recovered from the Great Recession. In 2007, immediately before the Great Recession, the median wealth of blacks was nearly 14 percent that of whites. Although black wealth increased at a faster rate than white wealth in 2016, blacks still owned less than 10 percent of whites' wealth at the median.

A multigenerational study of people from five race groups analyzed upward mobility trends in American cities. The study concluded that black men who grew up in racially segregated neighborhoods were substantially less likely to gain upward economic mobility, finding "black children born to parents in the bottom household income quintile have a 2.5% chance of rising to the top quintile of household income, compared with 10.6% for whites." Because of this intergenerational poverty, black households are "stuck in place" and are less able to grow wealth.

A 2017 study by Federal Reserve Bank of Chicago economists found that redlining—the practice whereby banks discriminated against the inhabitants of certain neighborhoods—had a persistent adverse impact on the neighborhoods, with redlining affecting homeownership rates, home values and credit scores in 2010. Since many African-Americans could not access conventional home loans, they had to turn to predatory lenders (who charged high interest rates). Due to lower home ownership rates, slumlords were able to rent out apartments that would otherwise be owned.

Retail

Brick and mortar 
Retail redlining is a spatially discriminatory practice among retailers. Taxicab services and delivery food may not serve certain areas, based on their ethnic-minority composition and assumptions about business (and perceived crime), rather than data and economic criteria, such as the potential profitability of operating in those areas. Consequently, consumers in these areas are vulnerable to prices set by fewer retailers. They may be exploited by retailers who charge higher prices and/or offer them inferior goods.

Online 
A 2012 study by The Wall Street Journal found that Staples, The Home Depot, Rosetta Stone and some other online retailers displayed different prices to customers in different locations (distinct from shipping prices).  Staples based discounts on proximity to competitors like OfficeMax and Office Depot.  This generally resulted in higher prices for customers in more rural areas, who were on average less wealthy than customers seeing lower prices.

Liquorlining 

Some service providers target low-income neighborhoods for nuisance sales. When those services are believed to have adverse effects on a community, they may considered to be a form of "reverse redlining".  The term "liquorlining" is sometimes used to describe high densities of liquor stores in low income and/or minority communities relative to surrounding areas. High densities of liquor stores are associated with crime and public health issues, which may in turn drive away supermarkets, grocery stores, and other retail outlets, contributing to low levels of economic development. Controlled for income, nonwhites face higher concentrations of liquor stores than do whites. One study done on "liquorlining" found that, in urban neighborhoods, there is weak correlation between demand for alcohol and supply of liquor stores.

Financial services

Student loans 
In December 2007, a class action lawsuit was brought against student loan lending giant Sallie Mae in the United States District Court for the District of Connecticut. The class alleged that Sallie Mae discriminated against African American and Hispanic private student loan applicants.

The case alleged that the factors Sallie Mae used to underwrite private student loans caused a disparate impact on students attending schools with higher minority populations. The suit also alleged that Sallie Mae failed to properly disclose loan terms to private student loan borrowers.

The lawsuit was settled in 2011. The terms of the settlement included Sallie Mae agreeing to make a $500,000 donation to the United Negro College Fund and the attorneys for the plaintiffs receiving $1.8 million in attorneys' fees.

Credit cards 
Credit card redlining is a spatially discriminatory practice among credit card issuers, of providing different amounts of credit to different areas, based on their ethnic-minority composition, rather than on economic criteria, such as the potential profitability of operating in those areas. Scholars assess certain policies, such as credit card issuers reducing credit lines of individuals with a record of purchases at retailers frequented by so-called "high-risk" customers, to be akin to redlining.

Banks 
Much of the economic impacts we find as a result of redlining and the banking system directly impact the African American community. Beginning in the 1960s, there was a large influx of black veterans and their families moving into suburban white communities. As blacks moved in, whites moved out and the market value of these homes dropped dramatically.  In observation of said market values, bank lenders were able to keep close track by literally drawing red lines around the neighborhoods on a map. These lines signified areas that they would not invest in. By way of racial redlining, not only banks but savings and loans companies, insurance companies, grocery chains, and even pizza delivery companies thwarted economic vitality in black communities. The severe lacking in civil rights laws in combination with the economic impact led to the passing of the Community Reinvestment Act in 1977.

Racial and economic redlining set the people who live in these communities up for failure from the start, so much so that banks would often deny people who came from these areas bank loans or offered them at stricter repayment rates. As a result, there was a very low rate at which people (in particular African Americans) were able to own their homes; opening the door for slum landlords (who could get approved for low interest loans in those communities) to take over and do as they saw fit.

Insurance 
Gregory D. Squires wrote in 2003 that data showed that race continues to affect the policies and practices of the insurance industry. Racial profiling or redlining has a long history in the property-insurance industry in the United States. From a review of industry underwriting and marketing materials, court documents, and research by government agencies, industry and community groups, and academics, it is clear that race has long affected and continues to affect the policies and practices of the insurance industry. Home-insurance agents may try to assess the ethnicity of a potential customer just by telephone, affecting what services they offer to inquiries about purchasing a home insurance policy. This type of discrimination is called linguistic profiling. There have also been concerns raised about redlining in the automotive insurance industry. Reviews of insurance scores based on credit are shown to have unequal results by ethnic group. The Ohio Department of Insurance in the early 21st century allows insurance providers to use maps and collection of demographic data by ZIP code in determining insurance rates. The FHEO Director of Investigations at the Department of Housing and Urban Development, Sara Pratt, wrote:

Like other forms of discrimination, the history of insurance redlining began in conscious, overt racial discrimination practiced openly and with significant community support in communities throughout the country. There was documented overt discrimination in practices relating to residential housing—from the appraisal manuals which established an articulated "policy" of preferences based on race, religion and national origin. to lending practices which only made loans available in certain parts of town or to certain borrowers, to the decision-making process in loans and insurance which allowed the insertion of discriminatory assessments into final decisions about either.

Mortgages 
In reverse redlining, lenders and insurers target minority consumers by charging them more than a similarly situated white consumer would be charged, specifically marketing the most expensive and onerous loan products. In the 2000s, some financial institutions considered black communities as suitable for subprime mortgages. Wells Fargo partnered with churches in black communities, where pastors would deliver "wealth building" sermons encouraging new mortgage applications. The bank would then make a donation to the church in return for every new application. Many working-class blacks wanted to be included in the nation's home-owning trend. Instead of empowering them to contribute to homeownership and community progress, predatory lending practices through reverse redlining stripped the equity homeowners sought and drained the wealth of those communities for the enrichment of financial firms. The growth of subprime lending, higher cost loans to borrowers with flaws on their credit records, prior to the 2008 financial crisis, coupled with growing law enforcement activity in those areas, clearly showed a surge in manipulative practices. Not all subprime loans were predatory, but virtually all predatory loans were subprime. Predatory loans are dangerous because they charge unreasonably higher rates and fees compared to the risk, trapping homeowners in unaffordable debt and often costing them their homes and life savings.

A survey of two districts of similar incomes, one being largely white and the other largely black, found that bank branches in the black community offered exclusively subprime loans. Studies found out that high-income blacks were almost twice as likely to end up with subprime home-purchase mortgages compared to low-income whites. Fueled by deep racism, some loan officers referred to blacks as "mud people" and to subprime lending as "ghetto loans". Lower savings rate and distrust of banks, stemming from this legacy of redlining, may explain why there are fewer financial institutions in minority neighborhoods. In the early 21st century, brokers and telemarketers actively encouraged subprime mortgages to be offered to minority residents. A majority of the loans were refinance transactions, allowing homeowners to take cash out of their appreciating property or pay off credit card and other debt.

Redlining has helped preserve residential segregation between blacks and whites in the United States. Lending institutions such as Wells Fargo have shown that they treat black mortgage applicants differently when they are buying homes in white neighborhoods than when buying homes in black neighborhoods by offering them subprime and predatory loans when black residents try and integrate neighborhoods.

The inequality in loaning extends past residential to commercial loans as well; Dan Immergluck writes that in 2002, small businesses in black neighborhoods received fewer loans, even after accounting for business density, business size, industrial mix, neighborhood income, and the credit quality of local businesses.

Several State Attorneys General have begun investigating these de facto practices, which may violate fair lending laws. The NAACP filed a class-action lawsuit charging systematic racial discrimination by more than a dozen banks.

Environmental racism 

Policies related to redlining and urban decay can also act as a form of environmental racism, which in turn affect public health. Urban minority communities may face environmental racism in the form of parks that are smaller, less accessible and of poorer quality than those in more affluent or white areas in some cities, which may have an indirect effect on health, since young people have fewer places to play, and adults have fewer opportunities for exercise.
A 2022 study published in the journal Environmental Science & Technology Letters found redlined areas in 202 US cities had higher levels of air pollution (nitrogen dioxide and fine particulate matter) in 2010, so 80 years later.

In 1990, Robert Wallace wrote that the pattern of the AIDS outbreak during the 80s was affected by the outcomes of a program of "planned shrinkage" directed at African-American and Hispanic communities. It was implemented through systematic denial of municipal services, particularly fire protection resources, essential to maintain urban levels of population density and ensure community stability. Institutionalized racism affects general health care as well as the quality of AIDS health intervention and services in minority communities. The over-representation of minorities in various disease categories, including AIDS, is partially related to environmental racism. The national response to the AIDS epidemic in minority communities was slow during the 80s and 90s, showing an insensitivity to ethnic diversity in prevention efforts and AIDS health services.

Environmental justice scholars such as Laura Pulido, Department Head of Ethnic Studies and Professor at the University of Oregon, and David Pellow, Dehlsen and Department Chair of Environmental Studies and Director of the Global Environmental Justice Project at the University of California, Santa Barbara, argue that recognizing environmental racism as an element stemming from the entrenched legacies of racial capitalism is crucial to the movement, with white supremacy continuing to shape human relationships with nature and labor.

Workforce 
Workers living in American inner cities have more difficulty finding jobs than suburban workers do.

Digital redlining 

Digital redlining is a term used to refer to the practice of creating and perpetuating inequities between racial, cultural, and class groups specifically through the use of digital technologies, digital content, and the internet. Digital redlining is an extension of the historical housing discrimination practice of redlining to include an ability to discriminate against vulnerable classes of society using algorithms, connected digital technologies, and big data. This extension of the term tends to include both geographically based and non-geographically based discrimination.  For example, in March 2019 the United States Department of Housing and Urban Development (HUD) charged Facebook with housing discrimination over the company's targeted advertising practices. While these charges included geographically based targeting in the form of a tool that allowed advertisers to draw a red line on a map; they also included non-geographically based methods that did not use maps but rather utilized algorithmic targeting using Facebook's user profile information to directly exclude specific groups of people. A press release from HUD on March 28, 2019, stated that HUD was charging that "Facebook enabled advertisers to exclude people whom Facebook classified as parents; non-American-born; non-Christian; interested in accessibility; interested in Hispanic culture; or a wide variety of other interests that closely align with the Fair Housing Act's protected classes."

Political redlining 
Political redlining is the process of restricting the supply of political information with assumptions about demographics and present or past opinions. It occurs when political campaign managers delimit which population is less likely to vote and design information campaigns only with likely voters in mind. It can also occur when politicians, lobbyists, or political campaign managers identify which communities to actively discourage from voting through voter suppression campaigns.

Redlining and Health Inequality 
Health inequality in the United States persists today as a direct result of the effects of redlining. This is because health in America is synonymous with wealth, both of which minority groups have been denied as a result of discriminatory practices. Wealth affords the privilege of living in a neighborhood or community with clean air, pure water, outdoor spaces and places for recreation and exercise, safe streets during the day and night, infrastructure that supports the growth of intergenerational wealth through access to good schools, healthy food, public transportation, and opportunities to connect, belong, and contribute to the surrounding community. Wealth also provides stability of home as those with capital are not confined to the deteriorating housing stock that minority groups who were redlined were forced to try and rehabilitate without access to loans.

Redlining intentionally excluded black Americans from accumulating intergenerational wealth. The effects of this exclusion on black Americans' health continues to play out daily, generations later, in the same communities. This is evident currently in the disproportionate effects that COVID-19 has had on the same communities which the HOLC redlined in the 1930s. Research published in September 2020 overlaid maps of the highly affected COVID-19 areas with the HOLC maps, showing that those areas marked “risky” to lenders because they contained minority residents were the same neighborhoods most ravaged by COVID-19. The Center for Disease Control (CDC) looks at inequities in the social determinants of health like concentrated poverty and healthcare access that are interrelated and influence health outcomes with regard to COVID-19 as well as quality-of-life in general for minority groups. The CDC points to discrimination within health care, education, criminal justice, housing, and finance, direct results of systematically subversive tactics like redlining which led to chronic and toxic stress that shaped social and economic factors for minority groups, increasing their risk for COVID-19. Healthcare access is similarly limited by factors like a lack of public transportation, child care, and communication and language barriers which result from the spatial and economic isolation of minority communities from redlining. Educational, income, and wealth gaps that result from this isolation mean that minority groups' limited access to the job market may force them to remain in fields that have higher risk of exposure to the virus, without options to take time off. Finally, a direct result of redlining is the overcrowding of minority groups into neighborhoods that do not boast adequate housing to sustain burgeoning populations, leading to crowded conditions that make prevention strategies of COVID-19 nearly impossible to implement.

After years of de facto discrimination achieved through redlining, a system of structural racism blocking the achievement of health equity for all Americans has developed. As a result, a de facto health narrative that does not inspire belonging, compel political participation, nor dictate strategic change towards the social justice model for health equity has matured. In order to eliminate health inequality in America, a new de facto health narrative needs to dictate strategy. The process for achieving health equity relies on healthcare leaders articulating, acting on, and building the vision into all decisions and structures that support equity. Sufficient resources must be allocated to establishing a governance structure that can oversee health equity work. This includes taking specific action to address the social determinants of building intergenerational wealth as well as confronting institutional racism within health systems themselves. Next, health systems need to address the socioeconomic determinants of health which disadvantage minority groups. Through training, education, support groups, housing support, improved transportation, resource assistance, and community health programs, health equity organizations can begin to break down the long-lasting barriers that tactics like redlining have imposed on achieving health equity. In addition to ensuring the equal health outcomes of patients, healthcare organizations can also utilize their position as employers to develop a more diverse workforce through improved hiring practices and ensuring living wages to minority employees.

Strategies to reverse effects of redlining 
Redlining has contributed to the long-term decline of low-income, inner city neighborhoods and the continuation of ethnic minority enclaves. Compared to prospering ethnic minority areas, historically redlined or other struggling black communities need targeted investments in infrastructure and services in order to prosper.

Some of these strategies include:
 Targeting planning resources to improve employment, incomes, wealth, the built environment, and social services in struggling communities. 
 Recognize the importance of public transportation as a means for low-income communities to access jobs and services. 
 Provide jobs near the labor supply through targeted economic development. 
 Invest in the housing stock through neighborhood revitalization programs.
 Utilize inclusionary zoning (IZ) ordinances to improve amounts of high quality housing. 
 Equitably distribute hazardous waste sites so they are not concentrated in low-income and minority areas.

See also 

 Black flight
 Computer-assisted reporting
 Cream skimming
 Financial crisis of 2007–08
 Gentrification in the United States
 Ghetto tax
 Greenlining Institute
 Housing segregation
 Inclusionary zoning
 Jim Crow laws
 Levittown
 Price discrimination
 Racial capitalism
 Racial steering
 Racial views of Donald Trump#Housing discrimination cases
 Single-family zoning
 Sundown town
 Timeline of racial tension in Omaha, Nebraska
 Urban renewal
 Urban decay
 White flight

References

Further reading

External links

 
  Learn more about housing discrimination.
 
 
 
 
 
 

Blacklisting
Civil rights and liberties
Credit risk
History of racism in the United States
Mortgage industry of the United States
Racial segregation
United States Department of Housing and Urban Development
Urban decay
Urban politics in the United States
Redlining